
Gmina Mieścisko is a rural gmina (administrative district) in Wągrowiec County, Greater Poland Voivodeship, in west-central Poland.

Villages
Gmina Mieścisko contains the villages and settlements of Budziejewko, Budziejewo, Gołaszewo, Gółka, Gorzewo, Jaroszewo Drugie, Jaroszewo Pierwsze, Jaworówko, Kłodzin, Mieścisko, Miłosławice, Mirkowice, Mirkowiczki, Nieświastowice, Piastowice, Pląskowo, Podlesie Kościelne, Podlesie Wysokie, Popowo Kościelne, Popowo-Huby, Popowo-Kolonia, Sarbia, Strzeszkowo, Wiela, Wybranówko, Wymysłowo, Żabiczyn, Zakrzewo and Zbietka.

Neighbouring gminas
Gmina Mieścisko is bordered by the gminas of Damasławek, Janowiec Wielkopolski, Kłecko, Mieleszyn, Skoki and Wągrowiec.

References
Polish official population figures 2008

Miescisko
Wągrowiec County